Landschlacht railway station is a railway station in Münsterlingen, in the Swiss canton of Thurgau. It is an intermediate stop on the Lake line and is served by local trains only. It is one of three stations in the municipality of Münsterlingen.

Services 
Landschlacht is served by the S1 of the St. Gallen S-Bahn:

 : half-hourly service between Schaffhausen and Wil via St. Gallen.

References 

Railway stations in the canton of Thurgau
Swiss Federal Railways stations